The 48th annual Miss Puerto Rico Universe competition was televised live by Telemundo Puerto Rico. Miss Puerto Rico Universe 2002, Isis Casalduc of Utuado, crowned Carla Tricoli of Vieques as Miss Puerto Rico Universe 2003. Tricoli represented Puerto Rico at Miss Universe 2003 in Panama City, Panama.

Results

Judges
Iris Chacón
Wendy Fitzwilliam
Osvaldo Ríos

References

2003 in Puerto Rico
Puerto Rico 2003
2003 beauty pageants